The Danish Data Protection Agency was created, following the implementation of EU Directive 95/46/EC, regarding the protection of individuals with regard to the process of personal information and the movement of such.

The agency exercises surveillance over the processing of data to which the act applies, however the agency primarily deals in specific cases on the basis of inquiries from public authorities or private individuals or cases taken up by the agency on its own initiative.

See also
 General Data Protection Regulation
ePrivacy Regulation
Privacy law in Denmark

External links
 Official website

Government agencies of Denmark
Data protection authorities